Oyapock's fish-eating rat (Neusticomys oyapocki) is a species of rodent in the family Cricetidae.
It is found in French Guiana and Brazil.

References

Musser, G. G. and M. D. Carleton. 2005. Superfamily Muroidea. pp. 894–1531 in Mammal Species of the World a Taxonomic and Geographic Reference. D. E. Wilson and D. M. Reeder eds. Johns Hopkins University Press, Baltimore.

Neusticomys
Mammals described in 1978
Taxonomy articles created by Polbot